Seiland National Park lies in Alta Municipality and Hammerfest Municipality in Troms og Finnmark county, Norway. The park includes the majority of the island of Seiland, the second largest island in Finnmark after Sørøya. The park includes two glaciers: Seilandsjøkelen and Nordmannsjøkelen (the northernmost glaciers in Scandinavia). The  park was established on 8 December 2006. The  of the water inside the park's area, includes the surrounding sea and many fjords including the Nordefjorden, Sørefjorden, and Flaskefjorden.

Name
The name of the island must be very old, from Proto-Norse *Sai-aujo ("sea-island"), and the Northern Sami language name Sievju is probably an old loan and reflection of this form. In Norse times the name was transformed first to *Sæ-ey, and then to just *Sei. The last element land means "land" or "island" is a later addition.

References

National parks of Norway
Hammerfest
Alta, Norway
Protected areas established in 2006
Protected areas of Troms og Finnmark
Tourist attractions in Troms og Finnmark
2006 establishments in Norway